Maaka may be,

Maaka language, Nigeria
Golan Maaka, New Zealand